Chapter 1 is the debut album of the South Korean pop music group g.o.d, released on January 26, 1999. The album was produced by songwriter and JYP Entertainment founder Park Jin-young. The promoted track is "To Mother" (어머님께), which the group sang for their debut televised performance on January 13, 1999.

Release and reception
The album was produced under difficult circumstances as g.o.d's management agency had been affected by the 1997 Asian financial crisis and cut off funding for their trainees. It was eventually released after the group made their official debut performance on television. However, it was not an immediate success as sales figures were comparatively low and the group did not win first place on any music programs.

Two of the most famous songs from the album are "To Mother" and "Observation", the former eventually becoming known as one of the group's most famous hit songs. "Observation" is remembered for its "steering wheel" dance and the scifi-themed music video. The choreography for both songs was referenced in the music video of "Saturday Night" from the group's reunion album Chapter 8.

Track listing
All lyrics and music is written and composed by Park Jin-young except where noted.

  Signifies a composer who is also the arranger.

Charts and sales

Monthly charts

Sales

References

External links
Album Information on Mnet

1999 debut albums
G.o.d albums
Korean-language albums